Secretary of State for Trade and Industry v Bottrill [1999] EWCA Civ 781 is a UK company law and UK labour law case, which relates to issues such as lifting the corporate veil and the definition of "employee".

Facts
Mr Bottrill was the managing director of the insolvent Magnatech UK Ltd, the fact that he was the only shareholder did not preclude his claim for unpaid wages (£346.15 a week) from the National Insurance Fund.  Mr Bottrill’s sole shareholding was merely a temporary measure before the American Magnatech Group would take over ownership.

Judgment
Lord Woolf MR held that Mr Bottrill was an "employee" for the purpose of access to the statutory compensation fund.

See also

UK insolvency law
UK labour law

Notes

References

United Kingdom company case law
United Kingdom labour case law
United Kingdom corporate personality case law
Court of Appeal (England and Wales) cases
1999 in case law
1999 in British law